Eraina is a genus of moths in the family Oecophoridae erected by John Frederick Gates Clarke in 1978. All the species are found in Chile.

Species
Eraina thamnocephala Clarke, 1978
Eraina stilifera Urra, 2015
Eraina ungulifera Urra, 2015
Eraina furcifera Urra, 2015

References

Moths described in 1978
Oecophorinae
Endemic fauna of Chile